Zvonimir's blenny (Parablennius zvonimiri) is a species of combtooth blenny found in the Mediterranean and Black Sea. This species reaches a length of  TL. The identity of the person honoured in the specific name is uncertain but is thought to be the Medieval King of Croatia and Dalmatia Demetrius Zvonimir who reigned from 1075 to 1089 probably in allusion to the area where the type was collected.

References

Zvonimir's blenny
Fish of the Adriatic Sea
Fish of the Mediterranean Sea
Fish of the Black Sea
Aegean Sea
Zvonimir's blenny
Taxa named by Juraj Kolombatović